Ricardo Jorge da Silva Nogueira Rodrigues (born 28 June 1995) is a Portuguese professional footballer who plays for F.C. Alverca as a forward.

Career

Club career
On 16 January 2020, Rodrigues joined LigaPro club G.D. Estoril Praia. He then signed a pre-contract with F.C. Alverca on 20 May 2020, valid from the 2020-21 season.

References

External links

1995 births
Living people
People from Paredes, Portugal
Portuguese footballers
Association football forwards
Primeira Liga players
Liga Portugal 2 players
C.D. Aves players
AD Oliveirense players
C.D. Mafra players
G.D. Estoril Praia players
F.C. Alverca players
Sportspeople from Porto District